Stalag IV-C was a German World War II prisoner-of-war camp located in Bystřice (now part of the town of Dubí) in German-occupied Czechoslovakia (now Czech Republic), just north of the town of Teplice in the Ore Mountains region.

Camp history
The camp was opened in February 1941. The main camp was housed in a former porcelain factory. In 1943 fewer than 250 men were there, with the remaining population, some 23,000 men, attached to various Arbeitskommandos working in local industry and construction. The largest detachment, of 8,000 men, was at Brüx (now Most) working on the construction of the Sudetenländische Treibstoffwerke ("Sudetenland Fuel Works"), part of the state-owned industrial conglomerate Reichswerke Hermann Göring. This plant was designed to process oil from coal, and as part of the Allied campaign to attack German oil production it was bombed several times between July 1944 and April 1945. In the second raid on 21 July 1944 six British POWs were killed and 21 were injured. The camp was liberated by the Russian Army in May 1945.

See also
 List of prisoner-of-war camps in Germany

References

External links 
Photos of the POW Camp
Teplice

World War II prisoner of war camps in Germany
World War II sites in the Czech Republic